Adama Fofana (born 16 May 1999) is a professional footballer who plays as a defender for French club Dijon. Born in the Ivory Coast, Fofana plays for the Burkina Faso national team.

Club career
Fofana attended the Right to Dream Academy before joining Swedish club Varbergs BoIS in 2018.

On 31 August 2021, he moved to Dijon in France on a three-year contract.

Personal life
Born in the Ivory Coast, Fofana is of Burkinabé descent. He debuted with the Burkina Faso national team in a friendly 1–0 win over DR Congo on 23 September 2022.

References

1999 births
Living people
People from Woroba District
Burkinabé footballers
Burkina Faso international footballers
Ivorian footballers
Ivorian people of Burkinabé descent
Association football defenders
Right to Dream Academy players
Varbergs BoIS players
Dijon FCO players
Superettan players
Allsvenskan players
Ligue 2 players
Burkinabé expatriate footballers
Ivorian expatriate footballers
Expatriate footballers in Sweden
Ivorian expatriate sportspeople in Sweden
Expatriate footballers in France
Ivorian expatriate sportspeople in France